XM22 may refer to either:
 Gravel mines, small mine
 Stoner 63, a rifle